Vianney Bureau (born 13 February 1991), better known by the mononym Vianney, is a French singer-songwriter. At 24 years old he won the award for performing artist of the year at the "Victoires de la musique 2016" one year after having been named in the up and coming category  of the "Victoires de la musique 2015". His debut album Idées blanches was certified platinum. His second album was released on 25 November 2016 and was certified double platinum.

Beginnings
Born to a father who was a helicopter pilot in the army and a mother who worked in animal control, Vianney comes from a family of three brothers. Vianney grew up in music-loving family. Listening to his father sing while playing songs on the guitar by artists such as Georges Brassens, François Béranger, Maxime Le Forestier and Rickie Lee Jones, Vianney discovered a passion for music from the age of 12 and began to write songs from then on. In 2005, his father introduced him to some musician friends with whom he recorded his first track along with his older brother. In 2007, he held his first concert in an auditorium, the New Morning in Paris. He grew up in Paris and studied at Notre-Dame-des-Oiseaux College in the 16th district; where he would write a song of the same name, present on his first album Idées blanches. He then attended the Lycée militaire de Saint-Cyr, where he would spend three years. After his baccalaureate, in 2009, he studied at Paris School of Business, formerly the ESG Management School de Paris, for three more years and later earned a business diploma in London. Finally, he studied styling at École supérieure des arts et techniques de la mode (ESMOD), graduating in June 2014. He explained his school life by his "desire to live in different ways", and believes that these experiences had "opened [his] mind, socially and artistically".

Career
In 2011, Vianney met Isabelle Vaudey, who became his manager. It was Vaudey who encouraged Vianney to reveal his songs to the general public, and she arranged a meeting with vocalist Antoine Essertier, who offered to produce his debut album, Idées blanches, which was recorded throughout two weeks during summer of 2013 in the Auvergne mountains, not far from Vichy. The album was realised on 20 October 2014. With the album, he was signed to the "Tôt ou tard" record label in February 2014. His first charting single from the album was "Je te déteste" with the music video directed by Nicolas Davenel. The follow up single "Pas là" became his biggest chart success. The music video was directed by Nicolas Bary and featured Lola Bessis.

He took part in the 30-event tour of Florent Pagny entitled Vieillir Ensemble, and has recorded with other artists, including Samaha of Shaka Ponk, and then with Joyce Jonathan in "Les filles d'aujourd'hui". He also recorded an acoustic version of his album Idées blanches.

On 27 January 2015, he won the W9 Talent Award over other nominated acts Christine and the Queens, Indila, Black M, Irma, The Dø, Camélia Jordana, Peter Peter, Brigitte and Adrien Gallo. He was nominated for "Revelation Album of the Year" during Victoires de la musique 2015. In 2016, he won the "Artiste interprète of the Year" at the same event.

Awards and nomination

Discography

Studio albums

Live albums

Singles

As lead artist

As featured artist

Other charted songs

As songwriter

References

Notes

Sources

External links
Official website

French singer-songwriters
1991 births
Living people
People from Pau, Pyrénées-Atlantiques
21st-century French singers
21st-century French male singers
French male singer-songwriters